Therese-Giehse-Allee is a station on the U5 line of the Munich U-Bahn, named after the German actress Therese Giehse.

References

External links

Munich U-Bahn stations
Railway stations in Germany opened in 1980
1980 establishments in West Germany